Heapey railway station served the village of Heapey, in Lancashire, England.

History
The station was opened by the Lancashire and Yorkshire Railway on the Blackburn to Chorley Line. In 1960 the station was closed to passengers, although goods traffic survived until 1966.

Services

External links
Railway Images, BBC 
 A Day out by Train to the Hills, BBC
Photos and info about the station

References

Disused railway stations in Chorley
Former Lancashire Union Railway stations
Railway stations in Great Britain opened in 1869
Railway stations in Great Britain closed in 1960
1869 establishments in England